Luke Fenhaus (born April 8, 2004) is an American professional racing driver who competes full-time in the ARCA Menards Series East and part-time in the ARCA Menards Series, driving the No. 28 Chevrolet SS for Pinnacle Racing Group. He has also competed in late model racing in the CARS Tour, winning the 2022 Pro Late Model Tour championship, and in the Slinger Nationals, which he won in 2021. He also has previously competed in the Superstar Racing Experience.

Racing career

Fenhaus was inspired to race after watching his cousin, father and grandfather race snowmobiles on ice oval tracks. He would start racing snowmobiles and then began racing on pavement in go-kart and bandolero racing. At age 14, he began competing in late model racing events at State Park Speedway in his hometown of Wausau, Wisconsin. Growing up, he watched races at the track and was inspired by Tim Sauter and his success in races there. He was part of the Alan Kulwicki driver development program and would win the Lodi Memorial and the 2018 track championship at State Park Speedway.

After winning the 2021 Slinger Nationals, Fenhaus earned a spot in the Superstar Racing Experience race at Slinger Speedway. He competed in the race against many current and former NASCAR and IndyCar drivers and finished second (behind Marco Andretti) and led the most laps.

In January 2022, Fenhaus drove a stock car for the first time as he tested an ARCA Menards Series car in the series' preseason test session at Daytona International Speedway for Fast Track Racing. He did not end up running any ARCA races for Fast Track or another team in 2022.

In the CARS Tour, Fenhaus drove the No. 96 Chevrolet for Highlands Motorsports in 2022 and won the championship in their Pro Late Model Tour.

On March 3, 2023, it was announced that Fenhaus would run the full season in the ARCA Menards Series East for the new Pinnacle Racing Group team in their No. 28 car.

Personal life
Fenhaus' cousin, father and grandfather raced snowmobiles on ice oval tracks and he started his racing career racing snowmobiles before racing on pavement. He was inspired by drivers Tim Sauter (from watching him race at State Park Speedway) and Kevin Harvick (which is why he chose to race the No. 4 in late models and uses the same font that Harvick does in the Cup Series).

In 2022, Fenhaus graduated early from Wausau East High School and moved from Wisconsin to North Carolina (where NASCAR teams are located).

Motorsports career results

ARCA Menards Series
(key) (Bold – Pole position awarded by qualifying time. Italics – Pole position earned by points standings or practice time. * – Most laps led.)

ARCA Menards Series East

Superstar Racing Experience
(key) * – Most laps led. 1 – Heat 1 winner. 2 – Heat 2 winner.

 Season still in progress

References

External links
 
 

Living people
2004 births
NASCAR drivers
ARCA Menards Series drivers
Racing drivers from Wisconsin
People from Wausau, Wisconsin